Acha (also Achá) can be both a given name and surname. Notable people with the name include:

 Acha of Deira (6th–7th century), Princess of Deira
 Acha, Archbishop of Esztergom (11th century), Hungarian prelate
 Acha Septriasa (born 1989), Indonesian actress and singer
 Alberto Achá (1917–1965), Bolivian football defender
 Alexander Acha (born 1985), Mexican singer-songwriter
 José Aguirre de Achá (born 1877), Bolivian writer, politician and lawyer
 José María Achá (1810–1868), Bolivian military general and president of Bolivia
 Mariano Acha (1799–1841), soldier who fought in the Argentine Civil War
 Omar Acha (born 1971), Argentine historian and political essayist